Hamburg Records is a Hamburg, Germany based independent record label and artist management owned by Pyogenesis vocalist Flo V. Schwarz.

History

Flo V. Schwarz, who has been working in the music industry in companies, such as Nuclear Blast long before, originally set up the label to exploit the Pyogenesis-rights after the band's contract ran out in 2002, but the company has evolved into a bigger and respected business. Throughout the 2000s, the company included an artist management department, while the musically focus was on any kind of Rock, particularly on Punk. In 2004 Hamburg Records, based at the world famous red-light district St. Pauli Reeperbahn, started their mail-order with just management and label attached band products. Throughout the years this changed and the company runs that business for quite a few namable bands and music-affine brands. Since 2006 Hamburg Records offers with Shirtagentur the service to print all kinds of merchandising and grew within just a few years to one of the biggest suppliers, especially for all kinds of Punk, Rock and Metal bands in Central Europe. In 2010 after being partners in co-publishing with EMI and Warner, for a few years already, Hamburg Records started their own publishing named Glorious Songs. The first signing was the Top40 chart-success of Itchy Poopzkid "Lights Out London".

Most of the bands on Hamburg Records, especially those who sing in German are concentrated on the European markets but the activities for a few bands are yet territorially unlimited.

Current and former artists

 4LYN
 Atlas Losing Grip
 Bombshell Rocks
 Bloodhound Gang
 Donots
 Exploited
 Emil Bulls
 Itchy Poopzkid
 Montreal
 Samiam
 Solea
 Sondaschule
 ZSK

See also
 Pyogenesis
 List of record labels

References

External links
 

German independent record labels
Record labels established in 2002